Spilt Milk, a play on the idiom there's no point crying over spilt milk, may refer to:

 Spilt Milk (Jellyfish album), 1993 
 Spilt Milk (Kristina Train album), 2009
 "Spilt Milk" (American Horror Story), a 2013 episode of the series
 Spilt Milk (festival), held in Canberra, Australia
 Spilt Milk (novel), by Chico Buarque, 2009
 Spilt Milk, a 1972 album by Laurie Styvers
 Spilt Milk, a 2011 music piece composed by Stefan Abingdon
 "Spilt Milk", a 2022 song by Tommy Trash and Benson